Chrysocercops leprosulae is a moth of the family Gracillariidae. It is known from Pahang, Malaysia.

The wingspan is 4.9–6 mm.

The larvae feed on Shorea leprosula. They mine the leaves of their host plant. The mine has the form of a large, interparenchymal blotch occurring along the leaf-margin.

References

Chrysocercops
Moths described in 1992